The 1990 DHL Singapore Open was a women's tennis tournament played on outdoor hard courts at the Kallang Tennis Centre in Singapore and was part of the Tier IV category of the 1990 WTA Tour. It was the fifth edition of the tournament and took place from 23 April through 29 April 1990. Unseeded Naoko Sawamatsu won the singles title.

Finals

Singles

 Naoko Sawamatsu defeated  Sarah Loosemore 7–6(7–5), 3–6, 6–4
 It was Sawamatsu's first singles title of her career.

Doubles

 Jo Durie /  Jill Hetherington defeated  Pascale Paradis /  Catherine Suire 6–4, 6–1
 It was Durie's 1st doubles title of the year and the 5th and last of her career. It was Hetherington's 1st doubles title of the year and the 10th of her career.

References

External links
 ITF tournament edition details

DHL Open
WTA Singapore Open
1990 in Singaporean sport